Lew Jenkins (December 4, 1916 – October 30, 1981) was an American boxer and NYSAC and The Ring lightweight champion from 1940-1941. He was born in Milburn, Texas and was raised during the Great Depression. He began fighting in carnivals and later continued his boxing in the US Coast Guard. He was an exceptionally powerful puncher and 51 of his 73 wins were by knockout.  His managers included Benny Woodhall, Frank Bachman, Hymie Kaplan, and Willie Ketchum and his trainer was Charley Rose.

His punching power was legendary, and so was his drinking, carousing, and penchant for high-speed motorcycles. "The two toughest opponents I had were Jack Daniels and Harley Davidson," Lew Jenkins stated.

Jenkins took the World Lightweight Championship on May 10, 1940 in a third-round TKO against Lou Ambers at New York's Madison Square Garden.

Jenkins was admitted to the Ring Boxing Hall of Fame in 1977, the World Boxing Hall of Fame in 1983 and in 1999, the International Boxing Hall of Fame.

Early life
Verlin E. Jenkins was born on December 4, 1916 in Milburn, Texas to Artie James and Minnie Lee, formerly Minnie Lee White. He was the third of four children and had two older and one younger sisters. He started professional boxing around 1935 in Texas, New Mexico, and Arizona, but by 1938 was boxing regularly in Dallas.  The biggest fights of his early career took place after he moved to New York in 1939.

Professional career highlights
Jenkins defeated Lew Feldman on April 8, 1938 in a ten-round split decision at the Sportatorium in Dallas, Texas. Oddly, the Dallas crowd booed loudly after the decision of the judges and referees for Jenkins, the Texas native.

Win over Mike Belloise, November 1939
On November 21, 1939, Jenkins scored a seventh-round technical knockout against Mike Belloise, a former World Featherweight Champion, before a crowd of 12,000 at the Bronx's New York Coliseum. Belloise was unable to answer the call of the bell for the eighth round due to the severe punishment he had taken to the body in the sixth and seventh rounds. It was later confirmed that Belloise suffered a broken rib from the bout.

On January 24, 1940, Jenkins convincingly defeated Cuban boxer Chino Alvarez in a knockout only around fifteen seconds into the first round at the Sportatorium in Dallas. Jenkins landed only two or three punches and the rowdy Dallas crowd booed when the ten count was completed, with several climbing into the ring. The victory was Jenkin's ninth straight with six by knockouts. Jenkins sudden rise to prominence as a serious World Lightweight contender was not unprecedented, as he had been fighting professionally at least five years, but the quality of his opposition had increased dramatically in the last two years as many newspapers noted.  When he defeated Tippy Larkin in a first-round knockout at Madison Square Garden on March 8, 1940, he was finally scheduled for a World Lightweight Title bout with reigning champion Lou Ambers. In the impressive win over Larkin, Jenkins started cautiously, then flicked a few straight lefts. After Jenkins blasted with both hands, and in "2:41 of the first round Larkin was left flailing around in his own corner and down for the count."

Taking the World Lightweight Championship, May 1940
Jenkins defeated Lou Ambers in New York City on May 10, 1940 to become World Lightweight Champion. Ambers was down for a count of five in the first, briefly down again from a left in the second, and was down in the third before the referee stopped the bout when Jenkins landed a final solid right to Ambers' jaw.

After winning the World Lightweight Championship from Ambers, Jenkins lost his boxing discipline and spent time carousing at night and buying expensive automobiles. He drank recklessly, sometimes before bouts, and crashed several motorcycles and cars.

On March 8, 1940, Jenkins scored a first-round knockout of Tippy Larkin in a non-title bout at New York's Madison Square Garden before a crowd of 11,542. "Tearing out with the bell, the slugger from the Southwest (Jenkins) took command immediately. He threw both fists without a stop, finally connecting with a series of solid lefts and rights and Larkin dropped in his corner." The knockout occurred at the end of the first, 2:41 into the round. Jenkins had scored five straight knockouts in his most recent New York fights. A noteworthy opponent, Larkin would take the World Light Welterweight Championship in 1946.

On September 16, 1940, Jenkins managed to win a decision against Bob Montgomery in a non-title, ten-round decision, before a crowd of 12,900 at Shibe Park in Philadelphia. Jenkins was down in the third round for a count of nine. The United Press gave Jenkins five rounds to four for Montgomery, though ring officials gave Jenkins a somewhat wider margin.  Montgomery would twice hold the NYSAC World Lightweight Championship in May 1943 and November 1944.

World Lightweight Championship defense, November 1940
On November 22, 1940, Jenkins successfully defended his World Lightweight Title against Pete Lello in a second-round knockout at New York's Madison Square Garden before a largely hostile audience of around 11,000. Jenkins knocked Lello down four times in the second, usually with strong blows to the jaw and at least twice for counts of nine. He said after the bout that he had little memory of the bout after his first knockdown in the second. Lello had formerly knocked out Jenkins in a close bout that ended in an early seventh round victory in Chicago on March 24, 1939.

Losing the World Lightweight Championship, December 1941

On December 19, 1941 Jenkins lost his World Lightweight Title against Sammy Angott before a crowd of 11,343 at New York's Madison Square Garden. Fighting with a neck injury he may have received from motorcycle and car crashes, he was outpointed over 15 rounds. From then on he lost a significant percentage of his remaining bouts, though often against quality competition.

On September 30, 1949, Jenkins defeated Eddie Giosa in a ten-round unanimous decision at the Arena in Philadelphia. He had Giosa down for a count of eight in the second from a left hook, then put him to the mat again with a right to the head. He had Giosa down again in the tenth with a left hook to the head for a count of eight, though the fight continued and was determined by a points decision. Both men fought at 139 in the welterweight range. He had formerly lost to Giosa on May 2, 1949, in a fairly close split decision at the same location. The May victory was Giosa's fourth straight win.

Military career
Jenkins served in the Coast Guard in World War II, where he participated in troop deployment, and found himself in the thick of battle during the Allied invasions of North Africa and the D-Day invasion of Normandy, France. He re-enlisted in the infantry at the outbreak of America's involvement in the Korean War around 1950 and was awarded the Silver Star for saving several men from enemy fire.

Boxing comeback
He attempted a comeback after World War II, but was unable to regain his status as a top lightweight and welterweight. He retired from boxing in 1950. In 2003, Jenkins made the Ring Magazine's list of the 100 greatest punchers of all time.

Jenkins died October 30, 1981 at the Oakland Naval Regional Medical Center after a long illness. He is buried in Arlington National Cemetery.

Professional boxing record

Boxing achievements and honors

See also
Lineal championship
List of lightweight boxing champions

References

External links
 
https://boxrec.com/media/index.php/National_Boxing_Association%27s_Quarterly_Ratings:_1941
https://titlehistories.com/boxing/na/usa/ny/nysac-l.html
Arlington National Cemetery

1916 births
1981 deaths
American male boxers
Boxers from Texas
Lightweight boxers
World lightweight boxing champions
World boxing champions
International Boxing Hall of Fame inductees
United States Coast Guard personnel of World War II
United States Army personnel of the Korean War
Recipients of the Silver Star
Burials at Arlington National Cemetery